Stronger is the third album from Kate Earl released on November 20, 2012 on Downtown Records.  The first single, "One Woman Army", was released on September 18, 2012.

Track listing
 "Stronger" – 3:14
 "One Woman Army" – 3:55
 "I Don’t Want To Be Alone" – 3:07
 "Shadows & Light" – 4:08
 "California" – 3:45
 "Native Son" – 4:18
 "Not The End Of The World" – 3:37
 "Loyalty" – 2:31
 "Raven" – 3:36
 "Wicked Love" – 3:05
 "Is There Anyone Out There" – 3:29
 "I Get Around" – 3:35
42:20

Release history

References

External links
Kate Earl Official Site
Kate Earl Facebook
Kate Earl Twitter

2012 albums
Downtown Records albums
Kate Earl albums